Gary Cooper (1901–1961) was an American film actor.

Gary Cooper may also refer to:
Gary Cooper (outfielder) (born 1956), MLB outfielder for the Atlanta Braves in 1980
Gary Cooper (boxer) (born 1957), British boxer
Gary Cooper (third baseman) (born 1964), MLB third baseman for the Houston Astros in 1991
Gary Cooper (footballer, born 1955), English footballer
Gary Cooper (footballer, born 1965), English footballer
Gary Cooper (rugby league) (1938–2019), English rugby league footballer who played in the 1950s, 1960s and 1970s, and coached in the 1970s
Gary Cooper (musician), English classical musician and conductor
Gary Cooper (died 1991), ex-ex-gay cleric, see Exodus International#Michael Bussee and Gary Cooper

See also
Garry Cooper, English actor
Garrie Cooper, Australian motorsport designer, builder and racer